The following is a list of North Melbourne Football Club leading goalkickers in each season of the Australian Football League (formerly the Victorian Football League).

VFL/AFL

AFL Women's

References
North Melbourne Goalkicking Records

Goalkickers
Australian rules football-related lists
Melbourne sport-related lists